The 1995 Portuguese legislative election took place on 1 October. The election renewed all 230 members of the Assembly of the Republic.

The incumbent Prime Minister, Aníbal Cavaco Silva, decided not to run for a fourth consecutive term and the Social Democratic Party, choose Fernando Nogueira, one of Cavaco Silva's deputies, as leader and candidate for Prime Minister in a highly contested and bitter party congress in February 1995. But, the PSD was weakened by the end of the 10-year cycle of governments led by Cavaco Silva, amid scandals and the 1994 25 April bridge riots that shocked the country. During the campaign, Cavaco Silva toyed with the idea of running for the 1996 Presidential elections, which he ultimately did.

The PS easily won the elections with 44% of the votes, against the 34% of the PSD, achieving their first general election victory since 1983 and after a decade in opposition, but missed the absolute majority by 4 MPs. António Guterres, elected as PS leader three years before, became Prime Minister. The Social Democratic Party suffered a heavy defeat, losing almost 50 seats and 17% of the votes. This election marked the growing bi-polarization of the Portuguese political map. The two minor parties, the People's Party and the Democratic Unity Coalition (CDU) achieved only 15 MPs each, and for the first time ever the CDU failed to win a single district.

Although turnout, in percentage point, was lower than the previous election in 1991, almost 6 million voters cast a ballot on election day, the highest figure since 1980. Voter turnout stood at 66.3%, the lowest until then.

Background

Leadership changes
The four main parties all changed their leaders during the 1991–1995 legislature.

PS 1992 leadership election
The 1991 general election Socialist defeat, and the scale of it, surprised the party, with António Guterres actually saying he "was in shock". Then PS leader, Jorge Sampaio, faced a lot of criticisms about his strategy but, announced he was running for reelection as party leader. He would face António Guterres and Álvaro Beleza. A party leadership congress was called for February 1992, but, during the days prior to the start of the congress, Sampaio withdrew from the race and Guterres was easily elected as party leader: The results were the following:

|- style="background-color:#E9E9E9"
! align="center" colspan=2 style="width:  60px"|Candidate
! align="center" style="width:  50px"|Votes
! align="center" style="width:  50px"|%
|-
|bgcolor=|
| align=left | António Guterres
| align=center |
| align=right | 88.0
|-
|bgcolor=|
| align=left | Álvaro Beleza
| align=right | 
| align=right | 12.0
|-
|bgcolor=|
| align=left | Jorge Sampaio
| colspan="2" align=center | withdrew
|-
|- style="background-color:#E9E9E9"
| colspan=2 style="text-align:left;" |   Turnout
| align=right |
| align=center | 
|-
| colspan="4" align=left|Source:
|}

CDS–PP 1992 leadership election
Then CDS leader, Diogo Freitas do Amaral, resigned from the leadership following the party's poor results in the 1991 general elections. A party congress to elect a new leader was called for late March 1992 and 3 candidates were on the ballot: Manuel Monteiro, Basílio Horta, the party's candidate for the 1991 Presidential election and António Lobo Xavier. Manuel Monteiro was easily elected as leader:

|- style="background-color:#E9E9E9"
! align="center" colspan=2 style="width:  60px"|Candidate
! align="center" style="width:  50px"|Votes
! align="center" style="width:  50px"|%
|-
|bgcolor=|
| align=left | Manuel Monteiro
| align=center | WIN
| align=right | 
|-
|bgcolor=|
| align=left | Basílio Horta
| align=right |
| align=right | 
|-
|bgcolor=|
| align=left | António Lobo Xavier
| align=right | 
| align=right | 
|-
|- style="background-color:#E9E9E9"
| colspan=2 style="text-align:left;" |   Turnout
| align=right |
| align=center | 
|-
| colspan="4" align=left|Source: 
|}

PCP 1992 leadership election
The historic Portuguese Communist Party leader, Álvaro Cunhal, announced he would step down from the leadership of the party in late 1992. Carlos Carvalhas, the party's deputy leader was chosen as Cunhal's successor and was unanimously elected, but Cunhal remained a powerful figure within the party as a new body, the National Council, was created and Cunhal would lead it.

|- style="background-color:#E9E9E9"
! align="center" colspan=2 style="width:  60px"|Candidate
! align="center" style="width:  50px"|Votes
! align="center" style="width:  50px"|%
|-
|bgcolor=red|
| align=left | Carlos Carvalhas
| align=center | 
| align=right | 100.0
|-
|- style="background-color:#E9E9E9"
| colspan=2 style="text-align:left;" |   Turnout
| align=right |
| align=center | 
|-
| colspan="4" align=left|Source: 
|}

PSD 1995 leadership election
After serving almost 10 years as Prime Minister, there were doubts if Cavaco Silva would run for another term, thus, creating a big "tabu" in Portuguese politics. Cavaco promissed a decision during the Spring of 1995, but in January 1995, he announced he would not run for another term as Prime Minister and PSD leader. This led the PSD to call a congress to elect a new leader. The congress become iconic for how tense and stormy it was, with strong accusations between several party members. Three candidates announced a run for the leadership: Fernando Nogueira, former defense minister, José Manuel Durão Barroso, foreign affairs minister, and Pedro Santana Lopes, former culture secretary. Santana Lopes withdrew before the ballot, and Fernando Nogueira narrowly defeated Durão Barroso by just 33 votes. The results were the following:

|- style="background-color:#E9E9E9"
! align="center" colspan=2 style="width:  60px"|Candidate
! align="center" style="width:  50px"|Votes
! align="center" style="width:  50px"|%
|-
|bgcolor=orange|
| align=left | Fernando Nogueira
| align=right | 532
| align=right | 51.6
|-
|bgcolor=orange|
| align=left | José Manuel Durão Barroso
| align=right | 499
| align=right | 48.4
|-
|bgcolor=orange|
| align=left | Pedro Santana Lopes
| colspan="2" align=center| withdrew
|-
|- style="background-color:#E9E9E9"
| colspan=2 style="text-align:left;" |   Turnout
| align=right | 1,031
| align=center | 
|-
| colspan="4" align=left|Source:
|}

Electoral system 
The Assembly of the Republic has 230 members elected to four-year terms. Governments do not require absolute majority support of the Assembly to hold office, as even if the number of opposers of government is larger than that of the supporters, the number of opposers still needs to be equal or greater than 116 (absolute majority) for both the Government's Programme to be rejected or for a motion of no confidence to be approved.

The number of seats assigned to each district depends on the district magnitude. The use of the d'Hondt method makes for a higher effective threshold than certain other allocation methods such as the Hare quota or Sainte-Laguë method, which are more generous to small parties.

For these elections, and compared with the 1991 elections, the MPs distributed by districts were the following:

Parties
The table below lists the parties represented in the Assembly of the Republic during the 6th legislature (1991–1995) and that also partook in the election:

Campaign period

Party slogans

Candidates' debates
The 1995 debates, between PSD leader Fernando Nogueira and PS leader António Guterres, were the first general election debates since the 1985 elections.

Opinion polling

The following table shows the opinion polls of voting intention of the Portuguese voters before the election. Those parties that are listed were represented in parliament (1991-1995). Included is also the result of the Portuguese general elections in 1991 and 1995 for reference.

Note, until 2000, the publication of opinion polls in the last week of the campaign was forbidden.

National summary of votes and seats

|- 
| colspan=11| 
|-  
! rowspan="2" colspan=2 style="background-color:#E9E9E9" align=left|Parties
! rowspan="2" style="background-color:#E9E9E9" align=right|Votes
! rowspan="2" style="background-color:#E9E9E9" align=right|%
! rowspan="2" style="background-color:#E9E9E9" align=right|±
! colspan="5" style="background-color:#E9E9E9" align="center"|MPs
! rowspan="2" style="background-color:#E9E9E9;text-align:right;" |MPs %/votes %
|- style="background-color:#E9E9E9"
! style="background-color:#E9E9E9;text-align=center|1991
! style="background-color:#E9E9E9;text-align=center|1995
! style="background-color:#E9E9E9" align=right|±
! style="background-color:#E9E9E9" align=right|%
! style="background-color:#E9E9E9" align=right|±
|-
| 
|2,583,755||43.76||14.7||72||112||40||48.70||17.4||1.11
|-
| 
|2,014,589||34.12||16.5||135||88||47||38.26||20.4||1.12
|-
| 
|534,470||9.05||4.7||5||15||10||6.52||4.3||0.72
|-
| 
|506,157||8.57||0.2||17||15||2||6.52||0.9||0.76
|-
| 
|41,137||0.70||0.2||0||0||0||0.00||0.0||0.0
|-
| 
|37,638||0.64||0.5||0||0||0||0.00||0.0||0.0
|-
|style="width: 10px" bgcolor=#E2062C align="center" | 
|align=left|People's Democratic Union
|33,876||0.57||0.5||0||0||0||0.00||0.0||0.0
|-
|style="width: 10px" bgcolor=#000080 align="center" | 
|align=left|National Solidarity
|12,613||0.21||1.5||1||0||1||0.00||0.4||0.0
|-
|  
|8,279||0.14||||||0||||0.00||||0.0
|-
| 
|8,235||0.14||||||0||||0.00||||0.0
|-
|  / 
|5,932||0.10||||||0||||0.00||||0.0
|-
| 
|2,544||0.04||||||0||||0.00||||0.0
|-
| 
|2,536||0.04||0.2||0||0||0||0.00||0.0||0.0
|-
|colspan=2 align=left style="background-color:#E9E9E9"|Total valid 
|width="65" align="right" style="background-color:#E9E9E9"|5,791,761
|width="40" align="right" style="background-color:#E9E9E9"|98.08
|width="40" align="right" style="background-color:#E9E9E9"|0.0
|width="40" align="right" style="background-color:#E9E9E9"|230
|width="40" align="right" style="background-color:#E9E9E9"|230
|width="40" align="right" style="background-color:#E9E9E9"|0
|width="40" align="right" style="background-color:#E9E9E9"|100.00
|width="40" align="right" style="background-color:#E9E9E9"|0.0
|width="40" align="right" style="background-color:#E9E9E9"|—
|-
|colspan=2|Blank ballots
|45,793||0.78||0.0||colspan=6 rowspan=4|
|-
|colspan=2|Invalid ballots
|67,300||1.14||0.0
|-
|colspan=2 align=left style="background-color:#E9E9E9"|Total 
|width="65" align="right" style="background-color:#E9E9E9"|5,904,854
|width="40" align="right" style="background-color:#E9E9E9"|100.00
|width="40" align="right" style="background-color:#E9E9E9"|
|-
|colspan=2|Registered voters/turnout
||8,906,608||66.30||1.5
|-
| colspan=11 align=left | Source: Comissão Nacional de Eleições
|}

Distribution by constituency

|- class="unsortable"
!rowspan=2|Constituency!!%!!S!!%!!S!!%!!S!!%!!S
!rowspan=2|TotalS
|- class="unsortable" style="text-align:center;"
!colspan=2 | PS
!colspan=2 | PSD
!colspan=2 | CDS–PP
!colspan=2 | CDU
|-
| style="text-align:left;" | Azores
| 37.6
| 2
| style="background:; color:white;"|47.8
| 3
| 9.4
| -
| 1.8
| -
| 5
|-
| style="text-align:left;" | Aveiro
| 40.2
| 6
| style="background:; color:white;"|41.2
| 6
| 12.6
| 2
| 2.7
| -
| 14
|-
| style="text-align:left;" | Beja
| style="background:; color:white;"|45.8
| 2
| 15.7
| 1
| 3.6
| -
| 29.2
| 1
| 4
|-
| style="text-align:left;" | Braga
| style="background:; color:white;"|42.9
| 8
| 38.2
| 7
| 10.7
| 1
| 4.5
| -
| 16
|-
| style="text-align:left;" | Bragança
| 40.3
| 2
| style="background:; color:white;"|44.8
| 2
| 9.4
| -
| 1.9
| -
| 4
|-
| style="text-align:left;" | Castelo Branco
| style="background:; color:white;"|53.2
| 3
| 32.1
| 2
| 7.2
| -
| 5.3
| -
| 5
|-
| style="text-align:left;" | Coimbra
| style="background:; color:white;"|49.1
| 6
| 34.5
| 4
| 7.1
| -
| 5.1
| -
| 10
|-
| style="text-align:left;" |  Évora
| style="background:; color:white;"|42.6
| 2
| 20.2
| 1
| 5.2
| -
| 26.9
| 1
| 4
|-
| style="text-align:left;" | Faro
| style="background:; color:white;"|49.6
| 5
| 29.2
| 3
| 8.3
| -
| 7.8
| -
| 8
|-
| style="text-align:left;" | Guarda
| style="background:; color:white;"|43.7
| 2
| 39.9
| 2
| 9.9
| -
| 2.3
| -
| 4
|-
| style="text-align:left;" | Leiria
| 36.7
| 4
| style="background:; color:white;"|43.3
| 5
| 11.4
| 1
| 4.5
| -
| 10
|-
| style="text-align:left;" | Lisbon
| style="background:; color:white;"|44.3
| 24
| 29.0
| 15
| 9.4
| 5
| 12.0
| 6
| 50
|-
| style="text-align:left;" | Madeira
| 32.0
| 2
| style="background:; color:white;"|46.1
| 3
| 12.9
| -
| 1.3
| -
| 5
|-
| style="text-align:left;" | Portalegre
| style="background:; color:white;"|50.5
| 2
| 23.4
| 1
| 6.3
| -
| 14.0
| -
| 3
|-
| style="text-align:left;" | Porto
| style="background:; color:white;"|46.7
| 18
| 36.4
| 14
| 7.8
| 3
| 6.0
| 2
| 37
|-
| style="text-align:left;" | Santarém
| style="background:; color:white;"|45.8
| 5
| 31.0
| 3
| 8.7
| 1
| 9.5
| 1
| 10
|-
| style="text-align:left;" | Setúbal
| style="background:; color:white;"|44.9
| 9
| 18.4
| 3
| 7.2
| 1
| 23.8
| 4
| 17
|-
| style="text-align:left;" | Viana do Castelo
| 38.8
| 3
| style="background:; color:white;"|42.1
| 3
| 11.3
| -
| 4.6
| -
| 6
|-
| style="text-align:left;" | Vila Real
| 40.0
| 2
| style="background:; color:white;"|46.0
| 3
| 7.8
| -
| 1.9
| -
| 5
|-
| style="text-align:left;" | Viseu
| 38.4
| 4
| style="background:; color:white;"|44.3
| 4
| 11.5
| 1
| 1.8
| -
| 9
|-
| style="text-align:left;" | Europe
| style="background:; color:white;"|35.1
| 1
| 33.8
| 1
| 4.4
| -
| 6.4
| -
| 2
|-
| style="text-align:left;" | Outside Europe 
| 12.8
| -
| style="background:; color:white;"|69.3
| 2
| 3.8
| -
| 1.2
| -
| 2
|-
|- class="unsortable" style="background:#E9E9E9"
| style="text-align:left;" | Total
| style="background:; color:white;"|43.8
| 112
| 34.1
| 88
| 9.1
| 15
| 8.6
| 15
| 230
|-
| colspan=10 style="text-align:left;" | Source: Comissão Nacional de Eleições
|}

Maps

Notes

References

External links 
Comissão Nacional de Eleições 
Centro de Estudos do Pensamento Político

See also

Politics of Portugal
List of political parties in Portugal
Elections in Portugal

Legislative elections in Portugal
1995 elections in Portugal
October 1995 events in Europe